Nerves Junior were an American indie rock band based in Louisville, Kentucky. Over its six-year life, the band released a full-length album, As Bright As Your Night Light in September 2011 to favorable reviews. An EP Craters EP was released in 2013, before the band came to an end in May 2015.

History
The group Nerves Junior formed in 2009 sharing a love for fringe garage rock and pop. Their music has been described as expansive, eclectic, experimental psychedelic rock. The band has garnered comparisons to Radiohead with "effects-heavy lead guitar and the adventurous electronic beats".

Their sonaBLAST! Records 2011 release As Bright As Your Night Light was Pretty Much Amazing's Best Reviewed Album of the Year for 2011.

Discography

Studio albums
 As Bright As Your Night Light, 2011

EPs
 Craters EP,2013

References

External links
 
 
 

Indie rock musical groups from Kentucky
Musical groups from Louisville, Kentucky
2009 establishments in Kentucky
Musical groups established in 2009